Olivier Saminadin (born 6 September 1977) is a French swimmer from New Caledonia. Due to New Caledonia's status as an overseas territory of France, and its current lack of official recognition by the International Olympic Committee, Saminadin (like other swimmers from New Caledonia, such as Diane Bui Duyet), swims for New Caledonia in regional (Pacific) competition, and for France in continental and above championships.

He won the inaugural 400 I.M. title at the first French Short Course Championships in January 2005.

South Pacific Games
At the 1999 South Pacific Games, he set the Games Record in the men's 200 free (1:56.08).

At the 2003 South Pacific Games he won the 200, 400 and 1500 frees, the 200 fly, the 400 individual medley and the open water race; and was also part of all 3 New Caledonia's relays, each which also won. 

At the 2007 South Pacific Games, he defended his titles in both 400s (free and I.M.), the 1500 and the open water race. He also set the Games Record in the 400 free (4:04.92).

References

External links

1977 births
Living people
French male backstroke swimmers
French male breaststroke swimmers
French male butterfly swimmers
French male medley swimmers
New Caledonian male swimmers
French male freestyle swimmers
Male medley swimmers